Accord may refer to:

Businesses and products
 Honda Accord, a car manufactured by the Honda Motor Company
 Accord (cigarette), a brand of Rothmans, Benson & Hedges
 Accord (company), a former public services provider in south England
 Accord Healthcare, a subsidiary of Intas Pharmaceuticals
 Accord (French record label)
 Accord (Polish record label)

Organizations
 Accord (Nigeria), a political party
 Accord (trade union), a British trade union
 Accord Coalition, a coalition of groups and individuals advocating for reform of faith schools in Britain
 Accord Network, an American association connecting Christian organizations and agencies

Geography
 Accord, New York, United States, a hamlet and census-designated place
 Accord Pond, a reservoir in Massachusetts, United States

Other uses
 Accord, a series of media publications by Conciliation Resources, a peace organization based in London
 Accord and satisfaction, a concept in contract law
 Clark Accord (1961–2011), Surinamese–Dutch author and makeup artist
 Ms. Accord, a Puyo Puyo video game character
 Prices and Incomes Accord, agreement between unions and government of Australia to achieve price stability (1983-1996)

See also
 Accord Metropolitan Hotel, Chennai, Tamil Nadu, India
 Acord